Patricia "Pati" Chapoy Acevedo (born June 19, 1949) is a Mexican journalist and TV host, known for being the host and creator of the TV show "Ventaneando" by TV Azteca. She is widely considered as one of Mexico's preeminent public figures and one of the most fatphobic and nefarious.

References 

1949 births
Living people
Mexican television journalists
Mexican women journalists
Women television journalists